Tora Tora is an American glam metal band formed in Memphis, Tennessee, United States, in 1985. "Tora" means "tiger" in Japanese and the name is a play on the code name for attack used by the Japanese Imperial Navy during their attack on Pearl Harbor, "Tora, Tora, Tora". The actual origin of the band name was more likely a reference to the song of the same name recorded by Van Halen on their 1980 release Women and Children First. In a 1989 Headbanger's Ball interview with singer Anthony Corder and bassist Patrick Francis, they said that a friend of the band came up with a list of 60 to 70 different names for their band, and they picked the name Tora Tora because it stood out to them the most. They mentioned in the same interview that the original name of the band had been "Free Beer".

History
Tora Tora started out as a local garage band then eventually got studio time when they won a local Battle of the Bands contest. Following this, the band recorded To Rock To Roll as an independent EP. After its release the songs "Phantom Rider" and "Love's A Bitch" received extensive airplay on local radio station Rock 98. After signing with A&M Records, they recorded their debut album Surprise! Attack in 1989. This album peaked on Billboard'''s Top 200 at No. 47 and featured the singles "Walkin' Shoes" and "Guilty." The single "Dancing With a Gypsy" was on the soundtrack for the film Bill and Ted's Excellent Adventure later that year. Tora Tora was the first Band from Memphis, Tennessee, to have a music video, “Walkin’ Shoes” on MTV.

In 1992, their second album, Wild America, was released. It only achieved No. 134 on the Billboard charts and it did not sell as well, but, it was a more mature step at songwriting.

A third album, Revolution Day, was recorded in 1994, but it was never released due to label restructuring. After missing the due date, the band folded.

In 2008, all four original band members reunited to do several performances. One was a sold out performance at Newby's, a local club in Memphis, to celebrate their 20th anniversary of receiving their recording contract. After the show, a record was sold to fans which included songs from their first two albums and material slated for their unreleased Revolution Day album. The album was titled The Warehouse... 20 Years Later. The second occurred during Rocklahoma 2008.  The band played another reunion show at The New Daisy Theatre on March 7, 2009, in Memphis.

At the end of 2009, Tora Tora signed with the Nashville, Tennessee based FNA Records and released three albums. Before & After, Bombs Away: The Unreleased Surprise Attack Recordings, and Miss B. Haven': The Unreleased Wild America Recordings.

On February 28, 2011, FNA Records in conjunction with the band decided after 17 years since the completion of their third album, which was shelved indefinitely at the time due to label complications, to release their "lost album" Revolution Day. Anthony Corder stated about the Revolution Day Sessions:

Band members
 Anthony Corder – vocals, acoustic guitar
 Keith Douglas – guitar, backing vocals
 Patrick Francis – bass guitar, backing vocals
 John Patterson – drums

Discography
Studio albums
 Surprise Attack (1989) No. 47 US Billboard 200
 Wild America (1992) No. 132 US Billboard 200
 Revolution Day (1994)
 Bastards of Beale (2019)

Compilation albums
 Revolution Day (1994/2011) (recorded in 1994, Previously unreleased - released on February 28, 2011 by FNA Records)
 Before & After (2009) FNA Records
 Bombs Away: The Unreleased Surprise Attack Recordings (2009) FNA Records
 Miss B. Haven': The Unreleased Wild America Recordings (2010) FNA Records

Extended plays
 To Rock to Roll (1987)
 Unplugged (2020)

Singles
 "Walkin' Shoes" (1989) No. 86 US Billboard Hot 100
 "Guilty"
 "Phantom Rider"
 "Amnesia"
 "Dead Man's Hand"
 "Faith Healer"

Soundtrack appearances

Home video
 Live: A Benefit for Patrick Francis'' (2016)

References

External links
FNA Records
Official Tora Tora Myspace
Interview with Keith Douglas
SleazeRoxx article detailing the reunion
Article detailing performance at Newby's
Frontiers Records

1985 establishments in Tennessee
A&M Records artists
Glam metal musical groups from Tennessee
Hard rock musical groups from Tennessee
Heavy metal musical groups from Tennessee
Musical groups established in 1985
Musical groups from Memphis, Tennessee